Gun Hill may refer to

Gun (Staffordshire), a hill in Staffordshire, England
Gun Hill, East Sussex, a hamlet in East Sussex, England
Gun Hill Signal Station, a military outpost in Bermuda
Gun Hill (film). a 2014 American television action film

See also
Gun Hill Road (disambiguation)